Bogorodskoye is a rural locality (a village) in Kupriyanovskoye Rural Settlement, Gorokhovetsky District, Vladimir Oblast, Russia. The population was 4 as of 2010.

Geography 
Bogorodskoye is located on the Klyazma River, 20 km west of Gorokhovets (the district's administrative centre) by road. Litovka is the nearest rural locality.

References 

Rural localities in Gorokhovetsky District